Huainan Circuit or Huainan Province was one of the major circuits during the Tang dynasty, Five Dynasties period, and early Song dynasty. Huainan was also the name of Wu, whose territorial claims was nearly identical to the circuit. In 1072 during the Song dynasty it was divided into 2 circuits: Huainan East Circuit and Huainan West Circuit.

Its administrative area, between the Huai River and Yangtze, corresponds to roughly the modern provinces of northern Jiangsu, northern Anhui, southern Henan and northern Hubei, with a tiny part of Jiangxi.

Tang dynasty

Wu and Southern Tang

Song dynasty
The circuit administered roughly 22 prefectures (including 1 superior prefecture and 4 military prefectures) and 71 counties.

References

 
 

Circuits of the Song dynasty
Circuits of the Tang dynasty
Former circuits in Jiangsu
Former circuits in Anhui
Former circuits in Hubei
Former circuits in Henan
1072 disestablishments